Percy Addison Wood Jr. (June 7, 1920 – June 23, 2008) was a United Airlines executive who was notably injured by a bomb sent from Ted Kaczynski. Wood had never met Kaczynski, but Kaczynski was believed to be fascinated with Wood, sometimes encasing his bombs in wood, and may have chosen Wood in part for his name. Wood was injured June 10, 1980, in the fourth explosion attributed to the Unabomber, and suffered burns and cuts over much of his body when he opened a package left in the mailbox of his Lake Forest, Illinois home. Inside the package was a copy of the book Ice Brothers, which had a bomb rigged inside.

Biography 
Wood was born in Oakland, California on June 7, 1920 and resided in San Mateo, California, Greenwich, Connecticut and Lake Forest, prior to retiring to Florida. He was past President and Chief Operating Officer of United Airlines, where he worked for 41 years. Wood joined United in 1941, and was named president of the airline in 1978, taking over the post from Richard J. Ferris, who was named chairman of the board. Ferris also was president of UAL Inc., parent company of the airline.

Wood attained the highest honor at both the Boy Scouts (Eagle Scout) and the Sea Scouts, as well as being a Troop Leader.

In the last years of his life he lived in Sandhill Cove in Palm City, Florida, and was a 22-year resident of Mariner Sands, Stuart, Florida. He died on June 23, 2008. He was preceded in death by his wife of 65 years, Mary Sherwood (October 2, 1920 – September 16, 2007), with whom he had four sons as well as nine grandchildren and four great-grandchildren.

References

1920 births
2008 deaths
United Airlines people
Businesspeople from Oakland, California
American chief operating officers
People from San Mateo, California
People from Greenwich, Connecticut
People from Lake Forest, Illinois
People from Stuart, Florida
People from Palm City, Florida